Harvey Dunn (1884–1952) was an American artist.

Harvey Dunn may also refer to:
Harvey B. Dunn (1894–1968), American television and film actor
Harvey Dunn Sr. (1899–1961), Australian rules footballer 
Harvey Dunn Jr. (1931–2013), Australian rules footballer